Joseph Wanton Jr. (1730–1780) was a Loyalist, merchant, Deputy Governor of Rhode Island in 1764 and 1767 and owner of Hunter House in Newport, Rhode Island.

Early life and career
Wanton was born to Governor Joseph Wanton and Mary Winthrop Wanton of Newport on February 8, 1730.  Wanton graduated from Harvard University in 1751 and was involved with privateers during the French and Indian War possibly where he attained the title of colonel. Wanton's first wife Abigail Honeyman, by whom he had 7 children, died in 1771. Wanton served as a vestryman at Trinity Church (Newport).  Wanton was elected Deputy Governor of Rhode Island in 1764 and 1767.

Loyalist during Revolutionary War
Wanton was a loyalist during the American Revolution and was accused of treason and imprisoned by Rhode Island General William West while the British occupied Narragansett Bay in 1776. When the British occupied Newport, he raised troops for the Loyalist cause. In 1780 Wanton's property (Hunter House) was confiscated, and he fled Newport when the Americans reoccupied the city.  Wanton likely died in New York in 1780 after fleeing there with the British. In 1781 his widow Sarah Brenton Wanton (his second wife whom he married in 1775) unsuccessfully petitioned the State of Rhode Island to return of the confiscated Wanton properties in Newport, Jamestown, Prudence Island, and Gould Island.

Death and Family

Some genealogists speculate that Wanton became an Anglican minister near Liverpool, England, although this seems inconsistent with other information about his life, including the 1780 burial record of one Col. Wanton in the churchyard at Trinity Wall Street Church, Manhattan.

It is more likely that it was Joseph and Sarah's son; Joseph Brenton Wanton who went to Trinity College, Cambridge in October 1795, aged 18; and later became a minister in Liverpool, England.

Joseph Brenton Wanton (JBW) was Joseph Wanton and Sarah Brenton's only child. Sarah Brenton Wanton remarried in 1784, to William Atherton 'Esquire of Jamaica' in Trinity Church, Newport, RI. William Atherton owned Green Park Plantation in Trelawny, Jamaica and Spring Vale Pen Plantation in St James, Jamaica. Sarah died in July 1787 and was buried in Clifton Burying Ground, Newport. It is recorded in Trinity Church Archives that 'He [William Atherton] immediately after her [Sarah's] death disposed of his household goods and went to England, where he had a tablet prepared, and had it set up in the church [Trinity Church, Rhode Island] in Nov. 1788.'  In England, he bought Prescot Hall outside Liverpool. He apparently took his step-son, Joseph Brenton Wanton with him, who was registered in Manchester Grammar School. and appears in Cambridge University Alumni as 'Joseph Brenton WAUTON, son of Joseph, Governor of Rhode Island',  having been to Manchester & Macclesfield Schools, 'where it states that the name was originally WANTON'. All Joseph Brenton Wanton's children were called WAUTON although in his Will of 1841, he signs as 'Joseph Brenton WANTON'. This seems to be when the name for this branch of the family was changed. In 1803 he married Mary Weston, daughter of a tanner from Halewood, Liverpool, and had 4 children, the two sons went to Cambridge and became ministers in the Church of England. JBW was a minister in the Church of England but retired through ill-health in 1819, living in Liverpool, the Isle of Man and Cheshire. He died in 1853.

See also

Hunter House

References

External links
Hunter House - Official Website

1733 births
1780 deaths
Harvard University alumni
Harvard College Loyalists in the American Revolution
Loyalists in the American Revolution from Rhode Island
Lieutenant Governors of Rhode Island